Michael Yansen Orah (born July 3, 1985) is an Indonesian professional footballer who plays as a left back for Liga 2 club Sulut United.

Honours

Mitra Kukar
 Piala Jenderal Sudirman: 2015
Persija Jakarta
 Liga 1: 2018
Bali United
 Liga 1: 2019, 2021–22

References

External links 
 
 Michael Orah at Liga Indonesia

1985 births
Living people
People from Tomohon
Sportspeople from North Sulawesi
Minahasa people
Indonesian footballers
Liga 1 (Indonesia) players
Liga 2 (Indonesia) players
Indonesian Premier Division players
Persmin Minahasa players
PSIR Rembang players
PS Barito Putera players
PSPS Pekanbaru players
Persepam Madura Utama players
Mitra Kukar players
Borneo F.C. players
Persija Jakarta players
Kalteng Putra F.C. players
Bali United F.C. players
Association football fullbacks
Association football wingers